Brooks F. McCabe, Jr. was a Democratic member of the West Virginia Senate, representing the 17th district in Kanawha County. First elected in 1998, Brooks served for eight years as chairman of the Senate Committee on Economic Development. He was  a member of the Senate committees on finance banking & insurance, economic development, natural resources, pensions, and government organization. Senator McCabe supported  legislation sought by other business leaders relating to major reforms in workers compensation, tax policy,  reducing public employee benefits (such as retirement and  healthcare) and other pro-business initiatives. In addition, he  sponsored  legislation relating to economic  development,  planning and land use which large corporations favored.

McCabe's day job is managing the  wealth he inherited from his ancestors  and investing money he received from his trust funds in real estate. He remains the primary  shareholder and managing member of  West Virginia Commercial Properties LLC. As scion of  one of Charleston's wealthiest families and a major landholder, he has been a major beneficiary of  the pro-business policies he championed.  McCabe was a longtime board member of Charleston Renaissance Corporation. He strongly supports the National Trust for Historic Preservation and its Main Street Program which he and his firm have utilized for tax credits and grants to fund numerous projects improving properties he owns.

Other boards on which he has served include the Chemical Alliance Zone, the Charleston Area Medical Center, West Virginia State College Foundation, the University of Vermont, and The Gow School (a private college preparatory school for dyslexic students in South Wales, NY).

External links
West Virginia Legislature - Senator Brooks McCabe official government website
Project Vote Smart - Senator Brooks McCabe (WV) profile
Follow the Money - Brooks McCabe
2008 2006 2004 2002 1998 Senate campaign contributions
 Company Website 

West Virginia state senators
1949 births
Living people
21st-century American politicians